Mike Monaco (born May 14, 1993) is an American television sportscaster who is currently employed as a play-by-play announcer for ESPN and its networks. Monaco is also the alternate television play-by-play voice for the Boston Red Sox of Major League Baseball (MLB) on the New England Sports Network (NESN).

Personal life and education 
A native of Cohasset, Massachusetts, Monaco was a three-sport athlete at Cohasset High School. He attended the University of Notre Dame and wrote for the school's student newspaper with the intent to become a Major League Baseball general manager, similar to the path former Red Sox general manager Theo Epstein had when he attended Yale. Monaco eventually transitioned to the school radio station at Notre Dame and subsequently began his broadcasting career.

Monaco currently resides in Chicago.

Career 
Monaco interned at NESN in 2012 while at Notre Dame, before broadcasting Fighting Irish sporting events and baseball games in the Cape Cod League. He also called Western Michigan Broncos basketball games while at Notre Dame before interning with the Red Sox's Triple-A affiliate Pawtucket Red Sox as a radio broadcaster in 2017.

Monaco joined ESPN in 2019 after two years working with Fox Sports and the Big Ten Network. He was named the alternate television play-by-play voice for the Boston Red Sox in 2019, filling in for regular play-by-play voice Dave O'Brien when O'Brien had prior commitments calling college football on the ACC Network. As a resident of Chicago, Monaco has also filled in on telecasts for Chicago White Sox, Chicago Bulls, and Chicago Blackhawks games.

References

External links 
 Official website
 

1993 births
Living people
People from Cohasset, Massachusetts
American radio sports announcers
American television sports announcers
College basketball announcers in the United States
College football announcers
Boston Red Sox announcers
Major League Baseball broadcasters